F.C. Lamezia Terme is an Italian association football club based in Lamezia Terme, Calabria.

History 
On 27 July 2021, Lamezia-based entrepreneur Felice Saladini announced the birth of a new football team: F.C. Lamezia Terme. Saladini hoped to unite fans of the other teams in Lamezia Terme, Vigor Lamezia and ASD Sambiase, who both decided to start over from the Prima Categoria amateur league, with the intention to have those fans support a common cause.

They played their inaugural season in 2021–22 Serie D Group I placing at 4th place and losing playoff semifinal against Acireale

Colors and badge 
The team's colors are blue and yellow. Their motto is "Vis Unita Fortior," which translates to "unity is strength" and is displayed on the badge.

Players

Current squad

Staff

Current
As of 23 January 2023

References

External links
Official homepage

Football clubs in Calabria
2021 establishments in Italy